Grepo is the short form of the German word for border police. It is usually found in English referring to the Grenztruppen der DDR (Border Troops of the GDR) who guarded the inner German border and the Berlin Wall, but can be used to refer to other border police, such as the former Bayerische Grenzpolizei (Bavarian Border Police), Hessen Grenzpolizei, and the separate Bundesgrenzschutz ("Federal Border Guard", now part of the Bundespolizei "Federal Police")

Grepo in English language fiction
The word Grepo has been used in many Cold War spy novels.  Possibly the first use was by Len Deighton in his 1964 book Funeral in Berlin.

Similar terms
The related term Vopo (Volkspolizei) has also been used in English fiction. The abbreviation for the criminal police—Kripo—is less common in English texts.

See also
Bavarian Border Police
Eastern Bloc politics

Footnotes

External links
 "Clamor in the East; Berlin Border Guards Stunned by the News"—New York Times article of November 10, 1989, reporting border police's reaction to free travel

Border guards
Defunct law enforcement agencies of Germany
Eastern Bloc
Law enforcement in communist states
Borders of East Germany
Inner German border

de:Bayerische Grenzpolizei